Algebuckina may refer to.

Algebuckina, South Australia, a town 
Algebuckina Bridge, a heritage-listed bridge in South Australia